José Andrés Ávila De Santiago (born 1 May 1998) is a Mexican professional footballer who plays as an attacking midfielder for Liga MX club Santos Laguna.

Club career

Youth
Ávila joined Atlas's youth academy in 2012. He then continued through Club Atlas Youth Academy successfully going through U-15,U-17 and U-20. Until finally breaking thorough to the first team, José Guadalupe Cruz  being the coach promoting Ávila to first team.

Atlas
On October 20, 2017, Ávila made his debut in the Liga MX against Club Tijuana playing 71 minutes in the 1–0 win.

Santos Laguna 
On January 4, 2021, his transfer Santos Laguna from the Liga MX was made official.

Career statistics

Club

Honours
Tampico Madero
Liga de Expansión MX: Guard1anes 2020

References

External links
 

1998 births
Living people
Mexican footballers
Association football midfielders
Atlas F.C. footballers
Tampico Madero F.C. footballers
Liga MX players
Ascenso MX players
Tercera División de México players
Footballers from Zacatecas
People from Villanueva, Zacatecas